Nicaragua competed at the 2010 Summer Youth Olympics, the inaugural Youth Olympic Games, held in Singapore from 14 August to 26 August 2010.

Swimming

Wrestling

Greco-Roman

References

External links
Competitors List: Nicaragua – Singapore 2010 official site

2010 in Nicaraguan sport
Nations at the 2010 Summer Youth Olympics
Nicaragua at the Youth Olympics